Caledonia was a British brig which saw service on the Great Lakes during the War of 1812. Caledonia was built in Malden in Upper Canada for the North West Company, and launched in 1807. During the early part of the War, the vessel was commandeered by the Provincial Marine, and played an important part in the Siege of Fort Mackinac, carrying troops and guns to the island.

Both had been transporting troops and materials eastwards, but Caledonia also carried a valuable cargo of furs. An American boat expedition commanded by Lieutenant Jesse Elliott captured the two brigs. Caledonia was taken to the navy yard at Black Rock, but Detroit was swept away by the current and forced to drop anchor within range of British cannons. After an artillery duel, the cable was cut and Detroit drifted down the river, grounding on Squaw Island (today known as Unity Island) where she was abandoned, and eventually set on fire and destroyed.

References
Sources
 
 
 
 
 
Citations

War of 1812 ships of the United Kingdom
Great Lakes ships
War of 1812 ships of Canada
1807 ships
Ships built in Ontario
North West Company
Provincial Marine